Ribas do Rio Pardo is a municipality located in the Brazilian state of Mato Grosso do Sul. Its population was 24,966 (2020) and its area is 17,309 km².

References

Municipalities in Mato Grosso do Sul